Gosho Petkov Ginchev (born 2 February 1969 in Madrets) is a former Bulgarian footballer who played as a defender. 

He was capped for the Bulgarian national team, playing two games at the 1998 FIFA World Cup. He was also in the Bulgarian Euro 1996 squad.

Career

Beroe
Ginchev began his career in Beroe and made his debut in the 1986-87 season.

Levski Sofia
After playing four seasons for Beroe, Ginchev signed a two-year-deal with Levski Sofia for a fee of around 1.500.000 BGN.

Honours

Club
Levski Sofia
 A Group (3): 1992–93, 1993–94, 1994–95
 Bulgarian Cup: 1993–94

References

External links 
 
 Profile at LevskiSofia.info

1969 births
Living people
Bulgarian footballers
Bulgaria international footballers
Association football defenders
Sportspeople from Stara Zagora
PFC Beroe Stara Zagora players
PFC Levski Sofia players
PFC Cherno More Varna players
Denizlispor footballers
Antalyaspor footballers
First Professional Football League (Bulgaria) players
Süper Lig players
UEFA Euro 1996 players
1998 FIFA World Cup players
Bulgarian expatriate footballers
Expatriate footballers in Turkey
Turkish people of Bulgarian descent
Bulgarian expatriate sportspeople in Turkey